LEDA 2108986, also known by its Case Western Reserve University designation "Case Galaxy 611" (CG 611), is an extremely isolated, early-type dwarf galaxy with an embedded spiral structure residing in what is likely an intermediate-scale disk.

The galaxy may be a counterpart to the rectangular-shaped galaxy LEDA 74886, in that they both appear to contain an intermediate-scale disk.  In the case of LEDA 74886, that disk is orientated edge-on to our line-of-sight.  The "early-type galaxy" class is commonly known to contain 
elliptical galaxies (E) with no substantial stellar disk (perhaps just a small nuclear disk) and lenticular galaxies (S0) with their large-scale disks that dominate the light at large radii. Bridging these two types of galaxies are the ES galaxies with their intermediate-scale disks, referred to as "Ellicular" galaxies in recent works.

Importance
LEDA 2108986 has accreted a gas disk which counter-rotates relative to its stellar disk. It also displays a young spiral pattern within this stellar disk.
The presence of such faint disk structures and rotation within some dwarf early-type galaxies in galaxy clusters has often been heralded as evidence that they were once late-type spiral or dwarf irregular galaxies prior to experiencing a cluster-induced transformation, known as galaxy harassment.  The extreme isolation of LEDA 2108986 is proof that dwarf early-type galaxies can be built by accretion events, as opposed to disk-stripping scenarios within the "galaxy harassment" model.

See also
LEDA 74886
NGC 1271 
Mrk 1216, NGC 1277, NGC 1332, NGC 4291

References

2108986
Dwarf galaxies
Boötes